The Thomas B. Finley House, also known as The Oaks, is a historic home located at North Wilkesboro, Wilkes County, North Carolina. It was designed by architect Norma Bonniwell (1877–1961) and built in 1893.  It is a two-story, Queen Anne style frame dwelling with a one-story rear ell.  It features a hip and gable roof, corner tower, fish-scale-cut wood shingles, and one-story, hip-roofed, wraparound porch.  It was built for prominent attorney Thomas B. Finley (1862–1942), whose firm Finley and Hendren occupied the Thomas B. Finley Law Office at Wilkesboro.

It was listed on the National Register of Historic Places in 2008.

References

Houses on the National Register of Historic Places in North Carolina
Queen Anne architecture in North Carolina
Houses completed in 1893
Houses in Wilkes County, North Carolina
National Register of Historic Places in Wilkes County, North Carolina
1893 establishments in North Carolina